Kirill Rasskazov (Рассказов, Кирилл Евгеньевич; born May 3, 1992) is a Russian professional ice hockey player. He is currently playing with HC Vityaz of the Kontinental Hockey League (KHL).

Rasskazov made his Kontinental Hockey League (KHL) debut playing with Avangard Omsk during the 2013–14 KHL season.

References

External links

1992 births
Living people
Amur Khabarovsk players
Avangard Omsk players
Russian ice hockey forwards
Severstal Cherepovets players
Torpedo Nizhny Novgorod players
HC Vityaz players
HC Yugra players